The Arctic flounder (Liopsetta glacialis), also known as the Christmas flounder, eelback flounder and Polar plaice, is a flatfish of the family Pleuronectidae. Its native habitat is the polar waters of the northeastern Atlantic and Arctic oceans, from the White and Barents seas to the coasts of Siberia in Russia and Queen Maud Gulf in Canada, and from the Chuckchi and Bering seas to Bristol Bay in Alaska and the northern Sea of Okhotsk.

Description
The Arctic flounder is a right-eyed flatfish. Its upper side is dark olive green to dark brown in colour, sometimes with black spots or dark patches; its underside is white. Its fins are pale brown, sometimes with a yellow tinge or faint dark spots.

Diet

The diet of the Arctic flounder consists mainly of small fish and zoobenthos invertebrates such as amphipods, molluscs and marine worms.

References

Arctic flounder
Fish of the Arctic Ocean
Arctic flounder